The 2015–16 season is Maccabi Tel Aviv's 110th season since its establishment in 1906, and 68th since the establishment of the State of Israel. During the 2015–16 campaign the club have competed in the Israeli Premier League, State Cup, Toto Cup, Israel Super Cup UEFA Champions League.

On 25 August 2015, the club qualified for the Champions League group stage, after drawing with FC Basel 2–2 (away) and 1–1 (at home).

Kit
Supplier: Adidas / Sponsor: UNICEF

Current squad

First team

Transfers

Summer

In:

Out:

Winter

In:

Out:

Pre-season and friendlies

UEFA Champions League

Second qualifying round

Third qualifying round

Playoff round

Group stage

Israeli Premier League

Regular season

Regular season table

Play-off

Championship round table

Israel State Cup

Israel Super Cup

Toto Cup

Group C

References 

Maccabi Tel Aviv
Maccabi Tel Aviv F.C. seasons
Maccabi Tel Aviv